John Thorne (fl. 1383–1393) of Guildford, Surrey, was an English politician.

He was a Member (MP) of the Parliament of England for Guildford in October 1383, September 1388 and 1393.

References

Year of birth missing
Year of death missing
English MPs October 1383
People from Guildford
Members of Parliament for Guildford
English MPs September 1388
English MPs 1393